Ulrich Schreiber (born 1951 in Solingen, Germany) is the founder and director of the International Literature Festival Berlin and - together with Hans Ruprecht - founder and director of the International Literature Festival Odessa.

Biography 
Schreiber apprenticed as a mason and later gained his GCE by attending evening school. After completing a course in Construction Engineering, he was granted the higher education entrance qualification. He studied Philosophy, Politics and Russian at the Free University of Berlin from 1973 to 1981 and successfully completed his teacher training in Celle in 1984.

From 1979 to 1981 he was an editor of the left-wing journal "Moderne Zeiten", a panel of the "Gruppe Z", a small New Left-group merging into the Green Party in the 1980s. He was a co-founder of the "Berliner Volksuniversität" in 1980 and founder of the "Hamburger Volksuniversität" in 1983. In 1985, he was the director of the German-Italian cultural festival in Hamburg. During the 1980s and 1990s he worked as cultural manager and architect in charge in Hamburg, Stuttgart and Berlin. In 1989, he founded the "Internationale Peter Weiss-Gesellschaft" which he presided over until 1998. In 1998, he organised the "Thomas-Bernhard-Tage" in Berlin.

During a poetry festival in Erlangen, the idea of a literature festival in Berlin emerged which he then founded in 2001. The international literature festival berlin is an event of the "Peter-Weiss-Stiftung für Kunst und Politik e.V.". The Berliner Festspiele Theatre is the festival center since 2005.

Furthermore, Schreiber is one of the founders of the PEN World Voices festival, The New York Festival of International Literature, a literary festival in Mumbai in 2007 and the WorldWideReading series since 2006.

Schreiber is a member of the German P.E.N. centre.

Together with the Hans Ruprecht, Ulrich Schreiber founded the International Literature Festival Odessa, which took place in Ukraine for the first time in 2015. The idea for this event emerged during a discussion in October 2013 (before the crisis in Ukraine) in Romania between the two founders and the Kievan author Andrey Kurkov.

Ulrich Schreiber lives in Berlin, Germany.

worldwide readings  
 20 March 2006: Eliot Weinberger "What I heard about Iraq"
 20 March 2007: In Memory of Anna Politkovskaya
 9 September 2007: For Democracy and Media Freedom in Zimbabwe
 20 March 2008: On the Anniversary of the Political Lie (Lu Xun "Remember To Forget")
 5 October 2008: In Memory of Mahmoud Darwish
 16 September 2009: For Democracy and Freedom in Iran
 4 June 2010: For Liao Yiwu, and in commemoration of the Tiananmen Square massacre
 20 March 2011: For Liu Xiaobo
 21 November 2011: In Memory of Heinrich von Kleist
 20 March 2012: For Liu Xiaobo
 23 April 2012: Against the Assad Regime
 12 December 2012: For Pussy Riot
 4 June 2013: For Li Bifeng
 25 October 2013: In Solidarity with Mikhail Khodorkovsky, Platon Lebedev and all Political Prisoners in Russia
 8 September 2014: For Edward Snowden
 21 April 2015: Commemorating the Centenary of the Armenian Genocide

Publications 
As an author
 The political theory of Antonio Gramsci, Berlin 1980, 4th edition 1994

As a publisher
 White-Book of cultural and educational policies in Hamburg(Weißbuch für Kulturpolitik in Hamburg). Hamburg 1986
 The imagery of Peter Weiss (Die Bilderwelt des Peter Weiss). Hamburg/Berlin 1995
 Anthologies and ilb catalogues of 2001–2017

Distinctions  
In 2015, Schreiber was awarded the decoration of "Chevalier de l'Ordre des Arts et des Lettres" by the French Ministry of Culture for his "contribution to the radiance of the arts and literature in France and the world".

References

External links 
 Internationales Literaturfestival Berlin
 "Maidan-Gespräche" (Norbert Kron)
 "We had no idea how little we knew! The international literature festival: Ten years of a miracle" (Sabine Vogel)
 "Literatur als Motor für den Dialog" (Mohamed Massad)
 "Lohnender Wahnsinn in Berlin" (Holger Kulick)
 "Mit 80 Autoren um die Welt" (Petra Ahne)
 "International Literature Festival Odessa"
 "Kunst in Zeiten der Politischen Krise" (Barbara Lehmann)

1951 births
Living people
People from Solingen
Festival directors
Recipients of the Ordre des Arts et des Lettres